"Reality" is the fourth single by Japanese group Dream. A VHS single was released September 20, 2000. The title track was used in Dream's commercial campaign for "Sea Breeze" toiletries. First pressings included one of three sticker sheets. The single reached number 17 on the weekly Oricon charts and charted for five weeks.

Track list
 Reality (original mix)
 Reality (Eurobeat mix) remixed by Fuyuno Tatsuhiko
 Reality (instrumental)

Information
 Lyrics by: Mai Matsumuro
 Music by: Yasuo Ohtani
 Arrangement by: Igarashi Mitsuru

External links
 http://www.oricon.co.jp/music/release/d/45163/1/

2000 singles
Dream (Japanese group) songs
Songs written by Mai Matsumuro
2000 songs
Avex Trax singles

fr:Reality
ja:reality